Cambridgeshire Constabulary is the local territorial police force that covers the county of Cambridgeshire and Peterborough unitary authority. The force of Cambridgeshire includes the cities of Cambridge, Ely and Peterborough, the market towns of Chatteris, Huntingdon, March, Ramsey, St Ives, St Neots, Whittlesey, and town and Port of Wisbech. Its emblem is a crowned Brunswick star containing the heraldic badge of Cambridgeshire County Council. 
 
According to a government report in July 2018 on policing numbers, the force consists of 1,383 police officers (giving the county a ratio of 163 officers per 100,000 people), 111 police community support officers and 778 members of staff. Together with 229 special constables and 84 police support volunteers. It had a budget in for the year of 2018 of £134 million, of which £78.4 million (58.5%) came directly as an annual grant from the Home Office and the rest from local council taxes.

The chief constable is Nick Dean. The force is overseen by the Cambridgeshire Police and Crime Commissioner (PCC).

History & background

Beginnings 
The origins of Cambridgeshire Constabulary date back to 1836, when the first police force in what is now the current boundaries of the force area was set up in the city of Cambridge under the name Cambridge Borough Police. This was later followed in Ely in 1841 by the magistrate of the town, as the Isle of Ely Constabulary covering Ely, Chatteris and March.

The boroughs of Huntingdonshire and Wisbech and city of Peterborough did not start their own police forces until 1857, under the County and Borough Police Act 1856, which required each borough to have its own local police force. Wisbech Borough Police came under the authority of the Isle of Ely Constabulary in 1889. In 1949, the two forces that covered the city of Peterborough; the Liberty of Peterborough Constabulary and the Peterborough City Police merged to form Peterborough Combined Police. Cambridge Borough Police was renamed Cambridge City Police in 1951, when a local force called Cambridgeshire Constabulary was formed to provide policing to the rural area around the city that was not covered by the borough police.

Mid-Anglia Constabulary to Cambridgshire Constabulary 
In 1965, all five forces that exist in the Cambridgeshire area (Cambridge City Police, Cambridgeshire Constabulary, Isle of Ely Constabulary, Huntingdonshire Constabulary, and Peterborough Combined Police) amalgamated to form the new Mid-Anglia Constabulary. The force was renamed Cambridgeshire Constabulary in 1974, when the new non-metropolitan county of Cambridgeshire was created by the Local Government Act 1972 with identical boundaries to the Mid-Anglia Constabulary area.

In 2001 the constabulary conducted one of Peterborough's biggest police enquiries following the racist murder of teenager Ross Parker.

2002 saw the Soham murders, an event that led to the biggest investigation in the history of Cambridgeshire police and one of the most expensive in the country, costing £3.5million.

Past and current collaboration 
In March 2006, as part review on policing nationally the then Home Secretary Charles Clarke proposed the creation of an East Anglian force merging Cambridgeshire with Norfolk and Suffolk. While Norfolk and Cambridgeshire supported it, Suffolk would have preferred to have Eastern Coastal force with Norfolk and Essex. Essex on the other hand wanted to stay alone. However, these proposes were scrapped after a cabinet reshuffle with John Reid as the new Home Secretary.

Since 2010, the force has been collaborating with Bedfordshire Police and Hertfordshire Constabulary to form a mid-Anglia "triforce" with various departments collaborating to make local efficiencies with resources. Areas that have been collaborated include Human Resources, Information Technology, Major Crime Unit, Dog Unit, Tactical Firearms Unit, Information Management Unit, Tickets and Collisions Office, Road Policing Unit, Scenes of Crime and Procurement.

There is also collaboration on a seven-force function with the adjacent forces of Norfolk, Suffolk, Essex and Kent with serious incident, counter terrorism and intelligence under the regional organised crime unit, the Eastern Region Special Operations Unit (ERSOU). Vehicle procurement is done in association with Thames Valley Police, British Transport Police and Civil Nuclear Constabulary as well as Hertfordshire and Bedfordshire under the Chiltern Transport Consortium.

Gallery

Chief constables
Cambridgeshire Constabulary (1851)
 18511876 : Captain George Davies
18771888 : Captain Reginald Calvert
18881915 : Charles J D Stretten
19151919 : Lt-Col Alan G Chichester
19191935 : William V Webb
19351941 : W Winter
19411945 : W H Edwards
19481963 : Donald C J Arnold*
19631965 : Fredrick Drayton Porter
*Arnold had been acting chief constable since 1946
Mid-Anglia Constabulary (1965)
 19651974 : Frederick Drayton Porter
Cambridgeshire Constabulary (1974)
 19741977 : Frederick Drayton Porter
 1977-1981: Victor Gilbert
 1981-1993: Ian Kane
 19942002 : Dennis George "Ben" Gunn
 20022005 : Thomas Lloyd
 20052010 : Julie Spence
 20102015 : Simon Parr
 20152018: Alec Wood
 2018present: Nick Dean

Officers killed in the line of duty

The Police Roll of Honour Trust and Police Memorial Trust list and commemorate all British police officers killed in the line of duty. Since its establishment in 1984, the Police Memorial Trust has erected 50 memorials nationally to some of those officers.

The following officers of Cambridgeshire Constabulary were killed while they were on duty, or returning to / from duty:

Operations
The head of the constabulary is Chief Constable Nick Dean, a former assistant chief constable of Norfolk Constabulary who came into the role as chief constable in October 2018. His deputies are head of investigations Deputy Chief Constable Jane Gyford, formerly a commander of the City of London Police and head of operations Assistant Chief Constable Vicki Evans, previously the Assistant Chief Constable of Dyfed-Powys Police. One notable former chief constable is the current Lord Lieutenant of Cambridgeshire, Julie Spence OBE QPM, who was chief constable from 2005 to 2010.

The constabulary headquarters is based in the Huntingdon suburb of Hinchingbrooke, which is home to the force executive board, information management and the force control room. The constabulary also works together with eleven police stations throughout the local policing area. They are: Cambridge (known simply as Parkside, after the street it is based on), Histon, Sawston, Ely, Cambourne, St Ives, Huntingdon town, St Neots, March, Wisbech, Hampton and Peterborough (known as Thorpe Wood, after the local nature park). It has a local police training facility in the parish of Abbots Ripton, near Alconbury (known as Monks Wood, after the local national nature reserve).

In local policing management, the force area is subdivided into two areas (also called divisions) and are known simply as North and South. Northern local policing headquartered at Thorpe Wood, covers the city of Peterborough and the district of Fenland. Southern local policing is headquartered at Parkside, and it covers the districts of Cambridge City, South Cambridgeshire, East Cambridgeshire and Huntingdonshire.

Governance
Prior to 2012, Cambridgeshire Constabulary was overseen by a police authority that comprised 17 members. This was made up of nine district councillors, of which seven were nominated by Cambridgeshire County Council and two by Peterborough City Council, three magistrates, nominated by the county's magistrates' courts committee; and five independent members, chosen from the community. However, In 2011 the Police Reform and Social Responsibility Act 2011 was passed by Parliament which abolished Police Authorities in favour of an elected police and crime commissioner (PCC). On 15 November 2012, elections took place in England and Wales to elect a PCC for each Police Area. In Cambridgeshire, the winning candidate was Conservative Sir Graham Bright, former MP for Luton. The Cambridgeshire PCC is scrutinised by the Cambridgeshire Police and Crime Panel, made up of elected councillors from the local authorities in the police area.

PEEL inspection
His Majesty's Inspectorate of Constabulary and Fire & Rescue Services (HMICFRS) conducts a periodic police effectiveness, efficiency and legitimacy (PEEL) inspection of each police service's performance. In its latest PEEL inspection, Cambridgeshire Constabulary was rated as follows:

In popular culture 
In 2019, the constabulary was involved in the Channel 4 reality programme Famous and Fighting Crime where five personalities Penny Lancaster, Jamie Laing, Katie Piper, Sandi Bogle and Marcus Brigstocke acted as special constables for the force.

See also
 Cambridgeshire Fire and Rescue Service
 East of England Ambulance Service
 Cambridge University Constabulary
 Law enforcement in the United Kingdom
 List of police forces of the United Kingdom
 List of law enforcement agencies in the United Kingdom, Crown Dependencies and British Overseas Territories

References

External links

 Cambridgeshire at HMICFRS

Police forces of England
Local government in Cambridgeshire
1836 establishments in England
Organizations established in 1836